Massimiliano Salini (born 11 March 1973 in Soresina) is an Italian politician.

In 2009 he was elected President of the Province of Cremona and held office until 2014.

In 2014 he ran for the European elections in the North-West Italy Constituency on the New Centre-Right – Union of the Centre list; with 27,000 preference votes he was the first of the non-elected. In 2014 he became MEP taking over from Maurizio Lupi. In 2019 he was re-elected MEP on the Forza Italia list.

References

Living people
1973 births
MEPs for Italy 2014–2019
MEPs for Italy 2019–2024
Forza Italia (2013) politicians
New Centre-Right politicians
The People of Freedom politicians